The Weekly's War is a 1983 TV movie about Dorothy Drain, a writer on The Australian Women's Weekly. She works under Les Haylen, Esme Fenston and Frank Packer.

References

External links
The Weekly's War at Peter Malone's website

1980s Australian television miniseries
1983 Australian television series debuts
1983 Australian television series endings